The sport of field lacrosse was played at the 1904 Summer Olympics, which marked the first time that lacrosse had been featured at the Olympic Games. Three teams participated — two from Canada and one from the United States. One of the Canadian teams consisted entirely of Mohawk nation players. The victorious Shamrock Lacrosse Team is more commonly known as the Winnipeg Shamrocks.

A second American team, the Brooklyn Crescents, was originally slated to round out the field but did not participate. They were scheduled to play a semi-final against the Shamrocks, but arrived too late and were disqualified.

Medal table

Medal summary

Results

Rosters

Shamrock Lacrosse Team
Élie Blanchard
William Brennaugh
George Bretz
William Burns
George Cattanach
George Cloutier
Sandy Cowan
Jack Flett
Benjamin Jamieson
Hilliard Laidlaw
Hilliard Lyle
William F. L. Orris
Lawrence Pentland

Sources:

St. Louis Amateur Athletic Association
J. W. Dowling
W. R. Gibson
Hugh Grogan
Philip Hess
Tom Hunter
Albert Lehman
William Murphy
William Partridge
George Passmore
William T. Passmore
W. J. Ross
Jack Sullivan
Albert Venn
A. M. Woods
Source:

Mohawk Indians
Black Hawk
Black Eagle
Almighty Voice
Flat Iron
Spotted Tail
Half Moon
Lightfoot
Snake Eater
Red Jacket
Night Hawk
Man Afraid Soap
Rain in Face

“Man Afraid of Soap” was also known as Freeman Joseph Isaacs, the father of Canadian Lacrosse Hall of Fame  inductee, Bill Isaacs. The English names of those players were Joe Crawford, Philip Jackson, Eli Warner, Amos Obediah, Thomas Will. Berman L. Snow, L. Bumbary, J. B. Eaver, Eli Martin, Sandy Turkey, Austin Bill, W. E. Martin, Jacob Jamieson, Eli Henry, Joe Clark, Frank Seneca, Charlie Johnon and Robert Lottridge.

See also
World Lacrosse
World Lacrosse Championship

References

External links

1904 Summer Olympics events
1904s
1904
1904 in lacrosse
Men's events at the 1904 Summer Olympics